Nona (Syriac: ܢܥܢܐ) is an Assyrian surname referring to the Prophet Jonah. The name derives from the Akkadian word "Nunu" or "Nuna", meaning large fish or whale (in reference to the Abrahamic text, Jonah and the Whale). The name is also a variant of the Hebrew and Aramaic word "Yona", also referring to Jonah.                           

                          

People with the surname Nona are usually Assyrians in Iraq which are living in the Assyrian diaspora now.

Persons with the surname Nona 

 Yacoub Nona, Assyrian singer 
 Emil Shimoun Nona, Assyrian Archbishop of Australia and New Zealand
 Ashoor Nona, Assyrian soccer coach for the Assyria Cup in Australia 
 Eshaya Nona, Assyrian soccer player from Kirkuk